Munsu station is a railway station in Munsu-myeon, the city of Yeongju, South Korea. It is on the Jungang Line.

External links
 Cyber station information from Korail

Railway stations in North Gyeongsang Province
Yeongju
Railway stations opened in 1941